USS H-2 (SS-29) was a H-class submarine. She was originally named Nautilus, the third ship and first submarine of the United States Navy to bear the name, which was derived from a Greek word meaning "sailor" or "ship." The nautilus is also a tropical mollusk having a many-chambered, spiral shell with a pearly interior. It was also the name of the fictional submarine in Jules Verne's novel Twenty Thousand Leagues Under the Sea which was prophetic of submarine technology.

Nautilus was laid down by the Union Iron Works of San Francisco, California. She was renamed H-2 on 17 November 1911, launched on 4 June 1913 sponsored by Mrs. William Ranney Sands, and commissioned on 1 December 1913, Lieutenant, junior grade Howard H. J. Benson in command.

Service history

Attached to the Pacific Fleet, H-2 operated along the West Coast — usually in company with  — on various exercises and patrols out of San Pedro, California until October 1917, when she sailed for the East Coast. Transferred to the Atlantic Fleet as of 9 November 1917, she cruised in the Caribbean Sea for most of that winter, also conducting special submarine detection tests with aircraft and patrol vessels from Key West, Florida. After having new engines installed at Philadelphia, Pennsylvania in the spring of 1918, she resumed patrols in the Caribbean until the end of the war, when she returned to the sub base at New London, Connecticut. From there, she operated in Long Island Sound, often with student officers from the submarine school on board.

Heading west again, H-2 sailed with H-1 on 6 January 1920, touching at several Caribbean ports before transiting the Panama Canal on 20 February. When H-1 went aground off Santa Margarita Island on 12 March, H-2 stood by and sent rescue and search parties for survivors, helping to save all but four of her sister ship's crew. She then continued to San Pedro, California, arriving on 20 March.

Drills and exercises with the Pacific Fleet and Submarine Division 7 (SubDiv 7) out of San Pedro were interrupted by an extensive Mare Island Naval Shipyard overhaul in the winter of 1921, after which H-2 returned to the same schedule. In company with SubDiv 7, she sailed from San Pedro on 25 July 1922, reaching Hampton Roads on 14 September. H-2 decommissioned there on 23 October. Her name was struck from the Naval Vessel Register on 18 December 1930, and she was sold for scrap on 1 September 1931.

References

External links
 

United States H-class submarines
World War I submarines of the United States
Ships built in San Francisco
1913 ships
Ships built by Union Iron Works